Bello Turji Kachalla  popularly known as Turji, (born 1994) is a notorious Nigerian terrorist and bandit leader who is operating in Northern Nigeria, particularly Zamfara, Sokoto and Niger state. Turji led a bandit gang on 2022 Zamfara massacres, almost 200 people including women and children were killed.

Early life
Turji was born in Shinkafi local government of Zamfara State, Northern Nigeria. Turji was raised as a Fulani cattle herder without education. Turji claims that some of his family's cattle were stolen by a pro-security forces vigilante group called the Yan Sakai who also murdered six of Turji's siblings. Turji also claims his father tried to sue the Emir of Zurmi (to whom the stolen cattle were given) but his efforts failed, and that the Yan Sakai killed his uncle. Turji told the Daily Trust in an interview that this had prompted him to take up arms.

Career 

Bello Turji is known to have been responsible for numerous massacres and terrorist attacks against civilians and security forces in the North West region of the country, especially Zamfara and Sokoto State.

In September 2021, the Yan Sakai attacked a mosque in Gwadabawa, killing eleven people. Turji responded by leading his bandits towards a market in Goronyo, Sokoto State. The bandits entered the bazaar and opened fire, killing at least 50 to over 60 civilians. In December 2021, Turji's forces attacked a bus in Sabon Birni, setting it on fire and burning the passengers inside to death. 30 people died in the ambush.

Turji was the mastermind behind the slaughter of over 200 people in Zamfara state in January 2022.

He is a rival of another bandit leader named Dogo Gide.

Personal life 
Turji believes that Fulani people are being subjected to genocide in Nigeria, and has justified his actions as being reprisals against attacks on Fulani bandits and civilians.

Turji claims to be a practicing Muslim and a close friend of Islamic scholar Ahmad Abubakar Gumi, Turji has enforced chosen elements of sharia law on the towns he controls. Despite evidence, Turji has "strongly denied" inquires about his relations to Boko Haram and other jihadist groups, insisting that his goals are unrelated to religion. Some of his officers have alleged that he celebrates Mawlid, which is not permitted under Salafism.

Public image 
Bello Turji is one of the best known Nigerian bandits, and enjoys a heavy amount of publicity from the media. A popular Hausa-language song in Nigeria depicts a man singing while chanting women in the background describe the bandit as a "hero among heroes."

See also
 2022 Zamfara massacres
 Nigerian bandit conflict

References

1994 births
Living people
Nigerian bandit conflict
Nigerian robbers
Outlaws
Nigerian rebels
Mass murderers
Nigerian Muslims
Nigerian Fula people
People from Zamfara State
Nigerian gangsters
21st century in Zamfara State
Crime in Sokoto State
21st-century Nigerian people
21st-century criminals